Oregon Route 200 is an Oregon state highway running from OR 99W at Monroe to the Lane-Douglas County line near Anlauf. OR 200 is composed of most of the Territorial Highway No. 200 (see Oregon highways and routes).

OR 200 was established in 2002 as part of Oregon's project to assign route numbers to highways that previously were not assigned; however, as of April 2018, the route remains unsigned.

Route description 

OR 200 begins at an intersection with OR 99W in Monroe. It heads south through Bear Creek to an intersection with OR 36, at which point the Territorial Highway overlaps the Mapleton-Junction City Highway No. 229. At Veneta, OR 200 crosses OR 126 and continues south through Crow and Lorane to the Lane-Douglas County line, where it ends. An old section of the Territorial Highway continues south as a Douglas County road to Anlauf, where it ends at an intersection with OR 99.

History 

The Territorial Highway is one of Oregon's oldest roads.  It can be traced to at least 1851, and by 1947 was referred to in a judicial opinion as the "Old Territorial Highway".

OR 200 was assigned to the remaining part of the Territorial Highway, except that section which is part of OR 36, in 2002.

Major intersections

References 

 Oregon Department of Transportation, Descriptions of US and Oregon Routes, https://web.archive.org/web/20051102084300/http://www.oregon.gov/ODOT/HWY/TRAFFIC/TEOS_Publications/PDF/Descriptions_of_US_and_Oregon_Routes.pdf, page 28.
 Stateoforegon.com, Coyote Creek Covered Bridge, http://coveredbridges.stateoforegon.com/bridges/lane/coyote_creek.htm
 Smith v. Williams, 180 Or. 626, 178 P.2d 710 (1947).

200
Transportation in Lane County, Oregon
Transportation in Benton County, Oregon